Lakshmana is a 2016 Indian Kannada language action film directed and written by R. Chandru. The film stars newcomer Anoop and Meghana Raj with V. Ravichandran playing a cameo role. The soundtrack and original score is composed by Arjun Janya whilst the cinematography is by Santhosh Rai Pathaje. The film is a remake of Telugu film Athanokkade (2005) directed by Surender Reddy.

The film was officially launched on 12 June 2015 in presence of Karnataka Chief Minister Siddaramaiah. The film's teaser was launched by the acclaimed filmmaker S. S. Rajamouli in December 2015. The film released on 24 June 2016 across Karnataka.

On the same day, Jigarthanda was released. Both the movies' music is composed by Arjun Janya.The film was a disaster.

Cast
 Anoop as Lakshmana
 Meghana Raj
  Prabhakar
 Chikkanna
 Pradeep Rawat
 Sadhu Kokila
 Sridevi Vijayakumar
 Chitra Shenoy
 Avinash
 V. Ravichandran as Police Officer (guest appearance)

Soundtrack

The music for the film and soundtrack are composed by Arjun Janya. The soundtrack album consists of 6 tracks and one instrumental piece.

References

External links
 

2010s Kannada-language films
Indian action films
Films scored by Arjun Janya
Kannada remakes of Telugu films
Indian films about revenge
Films directed by R. Chandru
2016 action films

kn:ಲಕ್ಷ್ಮಣ